Chelsea are an English punk rock band which formed in 1976. Three of the four original band members went on to found Generation X. 

More than two decades after its release, the band's debut single, "Right to Work", was included in the Mojo list of the best punk rock singles of all time.

History

Formation (1976)
The original line-up of the band was assembled in late 1976 by John Krivine and Steph Raynor, the owners of Acme Attractions, a fashion boutique shop in King's Road in Chelsea, London, comprising vocalist Gene October, guitarist William Broad (later and better known as Billy Idol), bassist Tony James and drummer John Towe; James and Towe had previously been in London SS. Raynor went on to establish the 'Boy' fashion label that became an icon of post punk British youth culture. After three support gigs playing cover versions of other bands' songs, Idol and James departed in November 1976, taking Towe with them, to form Generation X.

Early singles and Chelsea (1977-1979)
October then recruited Carey Fortune (drums), Martin Stacy (guitar) and Bob Jessie (bass), with the last two soon replaced by Henry Daze (Henry Badowski) and James Stevenson. 

Chelsea's first single, "Right to Work", was released in June 1977 by Step-Forward Records. Recorded by the October/Fortune/Daze/Stevenson line-up of the band, it was their most popular song, and also appeared on the soundtrack album (issued in 1978 by Polydor) to the 1977 Derek Jarman film Jubilee (which October had appeared in). 

Simon Cade Williams, aka Simon Vitesse, joined the band as bassist in 1977 for a UK tour and the band's second single, "High Rise Living". This rapid turnover of band members was characteristic throughout Chelsea's existence, with October the only constant presence.

On 25 August 1978 the band released another single, "Urban Kids", which was co-written by October and Alternative TV and produced by ex-Who manager Kit Lambert.

After spending 1977–78 touring in the UK and overseas, they released their first album, Chelsea, in 1979.

A singles compilation, Alternative Hits, was released in 1980; it was also issued in the U.S. by I.R.S. Records, retitled No Escape.

New line-ups, Evacuate and later albums (1982-present)
After a split, October put together a new line-up, including guitarist Nic Austin, which recorded the critically acclaimed second album Evacuate (1982).

October sporadically released albums with various Chelsea line-ups throughout the 1980s, including Original Sinners, Rocks Off and Underwraps' in which the band were joined by Clash drummer Nicky 'Topper' Headon on a cover of The Clash's song "Somebody Got Murdered" '. 

In the early 1990s, a line-up featuring the returning Austin and new bassist Mat Sargent released The Alternative (1993) and Traitors Gate (1994) albums. In 1999, the line-up from the first album, including Stevenson, reformed for the Social Chaos Tour across North America. A live album, Metallic F.O.: Live at CBGB's (released 2002), was recorded at CBGB in New York City during this tour. Augmented by Buzzcocks bassist Tony Barber, the band released Faster, Cheaper and Better Looking in 2005.  

Austin and Sargent returned in 2011, and this line-up released the album Saturday Night Sunday Morning in 2015. The Mission Impossible album followed in 2017. Both albums were recorded at Panther Studios in Surrey and produced by Dick Crippen of Tenpole Tudor, King Kurt and The Weird Things. 

May 2021 saw the release of Chelsea’s 12th studio album Meanwhile Gardens on Westworld Records. The long-standing line up of October, Austin and Sargent was joined by drummer Steve Grainger and featured guest performances from past band members Martin Stacey, James Stevenson, Bob Jesse and Rob Miller. The album was recorded at Panther Studios in between the 2020 COVID lockdowns with Dick Crippen producing.

Discography
Studio albumsChelsea (1979, Step-Forward)Alternative Hits (1979, Step-Forward)Evacuate (1982, Step-Forward)Original Sinners (1985, Communiqué)Rocks Off (1986, Jungle)Underwraps (1989, I.R.S.)The Alternative (1993, Alter Ego)Traitors Gate (1994, Weser)Faster, Cheaper and Better Looking (2005, Captain Oi!)Saturday Night Sunday Morning (2015, Westworld) Mission Impossible (2017, Westworld)Meanwhile Gardens (2021, Westworld)Radio Active Tapes (2022, Gutterwail)

Live albumsLive and Well (1984, Picasso) Metallic F.O.: Live at CBGB's (2002, Red Steel)Live at the Music Machine 1978 (2005, Released Emotions)Live and Loud (2005, Harry May)

Compilation albumsAlternative Hits (1980, Step-Forward) released as No Escape in USA (1980, I.R.S.)Just for the Record (1983, Step-Forward) Back Trax (1988, Illegal) Unreleased Stuff (1989, Clay) Fools and Soldiers (1997, Receiver) The Punk Singles Collection 1977-82 (1998, Captain Oi!)Punk Rock Rarities (1999, Captain Oi!)The BBC Punk Sessions (2001, Captain Oi!)Urban Kids - A Punk Rock Anthology (2004, Castle)Right to Work - The Singles (2015, Let Them Eat Vinyl)Anthologies 1,2 and 3 (2016, Westworld)

Singles
"Right to Work" (1977, Step-Forward)
"High Rise Living" (1977, Step-Forward)
"Urban Kids" (1978, Step-Forward)
"Decide" (1979, Step-Forward/I.R.S.) 
"No-One's Coming Outside" (1980, Step-Forward)
"Look at the Outside" (1980, Step-Forward)
"No Escape" (1980, Step-Forward)
"Rockin' Horse" (1981, Step-Forward)
"Freemans" (1981, Step-Forward)
"Evacuate" (1981, Step-Forward)
"War Across the Nation" (1982, Step-Forward)
"Stand Out" (1982, Step-Forward)
"Valium Mother" (1985, Communiqué) 
"Shine the Light" (1986, Communiqué)
"Give Me More" (1986, self-released)
"We Dare" (1994, Weser)
"Sod the War" (2007, TKO)
”Ca$h” (2021, Westworld) 

Compilation appearances
"Right to Work" on Jubilee'' (1978, Polydor)

References

External links
 

Musical groups from London
English punk rock groups
Musical groups established in 1976
1976 establishments in England